The 1997–98 Maryland Terrapins men's basketball team represented the University of Maryland in the 1997–1998 college basketball season as a member of the Atlantic Coast Conference (ACC). The team was led by head coach Gary Williams and played their home games at the Cole Field House. The team finished 21–11, 10–6 in ACC play and lost in the semifinals of the ACC tournament to UNC. They received an at-large bid as a number 4 seed in the 1998 NCAA tournament, where they lost to Arizona in the Sweet Sixteen.

Roster

Schedule and results 

|-
!colspan=11 style=| Regular season

|-
!colspan=11 style=| ACC Tournament

|-
!colspan=11 style=| NCAA Tournament

Rankings

References

Maryland Terrapins men's basketball seasons
Maryland
Maryland
Maryland
Maryland